A traffic island is a solid or painted object in a road that channels traffic. It can also be a narrow strip of island between roads that intersect at an acute angle.  If the island uses road markings only, without raised curbs or other physical obstructions, it is called a painted island or (especially in the UK) ghost island. Traffic islands can be used to reduce the speed of cars driving through, or to provide a central refuge to pedestrians crossing the road.

When traffic islands are longer, they are instead called traffic medians, a strip in the middle of a road, serving the divider function over a much longer distance.

Some traffic islands may serve as refuge islands for pedestrians. Traffic islands are often used at partially blind intersections on back-streets to prevent cars from cutting a corner with potentially dangerous results, or to prevent some movements totally, for traffic safety or traffic calming reasons.

In certain areas of the United Kingdom, particularly in The Midlands, the term island is often used as a synonym for roundabout.

See also 
 Traffic circle
 Refuge island

References

External links 

Road infrastructure

de:Verkehrsinsel
es:Mediana (tráfico)
sv:Refug
da:Helleanlæg